Lieutenant General (R) Muhammad Arif Bangash (1935 – 24 November 2019) was a Pakistan Army three-star general who served as governor of the North-West Frontier province of Pakistan.

Military career
He belonged to the family of the Khans of Hangu. Arif Bangash was commissioned in the 11th Punjab Regiment formerly known as 27th Punjabis on 18 October 1959 in the 20th PMA Long Course. He was a course-mate of Lt Gen Farrakh Khan and General Abdul Waheed Kakar, the army chief. During his army career, Bangash attended Staff college, National (1971) Defense College (1981) and German General Staff course at Fuhrung Academie at Hamburg (1977–78). After command of a Mountain Brigade he was posted as commandant of School of Infantry and Tactics (SI&T) in Quetta (1981–1984).
He was promoted to the rank of major general in 1984 and served as Inspector General Frontier Corps (1984–1986) and later commanded 9th Infantry Division at Kohat (1986–1989). During his stay in Kohat, Bangash founded Garrison Cadet College Kohat. He was promoted as lieutenant general in August 1989 and served as Inspector General Training and Evaluation (IGT&E) at the GHQ (1989–1991). From there, he went on as Commander V Corps, Karachi (1991–1992) overseeing the deteriorating situation in Karachi and Quarter-Master General at the GHQ (1992–1994). He retired from Army as QMG in 1994.

Post-retirement career
Arif Bangash took over as managing director of Fauji Foundation in April 1996 and stayed there until October 1996. Later he was appointed the governor of North-West Frontier province on 11 November 1996 where he replaced Maj Gen (retd) Khurshid Ali Khan. He was governor for less than three years before he resigned on 17 August 1999.

Arif Bangash died on 24 November 2019 In CMH Rawalpindi and is buried in the Army Graveyard.

References

1935 births
2019 deaths
Pakistani generals
Governors of Khyber Pakhtunkhwa
Pashtun people
People from Hangu District, Pakistan